An oak forest is a plant community with a tree canopy dominated by oaks (Quercus spp.). In terms of canopy closure, oak forests contain the most closed canopy, compared to oak savannas and oak woodlands.

Examples
 Southern dry-mesic oak forests in Minnesota dominated by red oak (Quercus rubra), white oak (Q. alba), and basswood (Tilia americana)
 Foloi oak forest in Greece, dominated by Quercus frainetto
 Oak–hickory forest throughout eastern North America
 Oak–heath forest

See also
 Oak savanna
 Oak woodland

References

Temperate broadleaf and mixed forests in the United States
Ecoregions of the United States
Flora of the Northeastern United States
Forest ecology
Quercus